"All My Loving" is a song by the English rock band the Beatles, from their second UK album With the Beatles (1963). It was written by Paul McCartney (credited to Lennon–McCartney), and produced by George Martin. Though not officially released as a single in the United Kingdom or the United States, the song drew considerable radio airplay, prompting EMI to issue it as the title track of an EP. The song was released as a single in Canada, where it became a number one hit. The Canadian single was imported into the US in enough quantities to peak at number 45 on the US Billboard Hot 100 in April 1964.

Composition
According to journalist Bill Harry, McCartney thought of the lyrics whilst shaving: "I wrote 'All My Loving' like a piece of poetry and then, I think, I put a song to it later". However, McCartney later told biographer Barry Miles that he wrote the lyrics while on a tour bus and after arriving at the venue he then wrote the music on a piano backstage. He also said "It was the first song [where] I'd ever written the words first. I never wrote words first, it was always some kind of accompaniment. I've hardly ever done it since either."

The lyrics follow the "letter song" model as used on "P.S. I Love You", the B-side of their first single. McCartney originally envisioned it as a country & western song, and George Harrison added a Nashville-style guitar solo. John Lennon's rhythm guitar playing utilised back and forth strummed triplets similar to "Da Doo Ron Ron" by The Crystals, a song that was popular at the time, while McCartney plays a walking bass line.

In his 1980 Playboy interview, Lennon said, "[I]t's a damn good piece of work... But I play a pretty mean guitar in back."

It has been hypothesized that the piece draws inspiration from the Dave Brubeck Quartet's 1959 song "Kathy's Waltz".

Recording
The Beatles recorded the song on 30 July 1963 in eleven takes with three overdubs. The master take was take fourteen overdubbed on take eleven. It was remixed on 21 August (mono) and 29 October (stereo).

A slightly longer stereo edition of the song, featuring a hi-hat percussion introduction not found on the common stereo or mono mixes was released on the German stereo version of With the Beatles in 1963. Later, it was released in Germany and the Netherlands in 1965 on a compilation album entitled Beatles' Greatest. This version was later released in the UK, but only as part of The Beatles Box (1980). It also turned up on a European CD bootleg release of the US Rarities with other bonus tracks not included on the original LP.

Releases and performances
 "All My Loving" was originally released in the UK on 22 November 1963 on With the Beatles.
 The first US release was on Meet the Beatles!, released 20 January 1964.
 The song was the title track of the All My Loving EP released in the UK on 7 February 1964.
 The song was released on another EP, Four by The Beatles in the US, on 11 May 1964.

"All My Loving" was the Beatles' opening number on their debut performance on The Ed Sullivan Show on 9 February 1964; the recording was included on Anthology 1 (1995). The group also performed "All My Loving" three times for BBC radio, once in 1963 and twice in 1964. The final version, which was recorded on 28 February 1964, was included on Live at the BBC.

The song was used twice in films by the group—it plays in the background at the end of the nightclub scene in A Hard Day's Night (1964), though without the drum opening and the coda; while an instrumental version appears in the film Magical Mystery Tour (1967).

According to Alan Weiss, a TV producer who happened to be there, "All My Loving" was playing on the sound system at Roosevelt Hospital emergency room when Lennon was pronounced dead after being shot on 8 December 1980.

Reviews
Several critics have praised the song. Ian MacDonald said, "The innocence of early Sixties British pop is perfectly distilled in the eloquent simplicity of this number". Richie Unterberger of AllMusic said it "was arguably the best LP-only track the Beatles did before 1964" and that if it had been released as a single in America it would have been a huge hit. Mark Lewisohn wrote in his The Complete Beatles Recording Sessions book that the song was "magnificent ... by far [McCartney's] best, most complex piece of songwriting yet".

The guitar work for "All My Loving" has also been lauded by later critics. Harrison's concise solo has been described as reminiscent of Chet Atkins, and Lennon's complex rhythm work (relying on the unusual use of constant triplets) was referred to as "the most recognizable feature" of the song; Lennon himself later described his performance as "a superb piece of guitar."

Personnel
Personnel per Ian MacDonald:
 Paul McCartney – double-tracked lead vocals, bass guitar
 John Lennon – harmony vocals and rhythm guitar
 George Harrison – backing and harmony vocals, lead guitar
 Ringo Starr – drums
 George Martin – producer
 Norman Smith – engineer

Charts

Cover versions
 Dutch Australian singer Johnny Young recorded "All My Loving" in early 1967.  His slower rendition reached #9 in Australia (Kent Music Report) and #4 on the Go-Set chart.

 Spanish band Los Manolos made a Catalan rumba version in 1992, which they played, along with Amigos Para Siempre, at the closing ceremony of the 1992 Summer Olympics in Barcelona, and became a summer hit in Spain.

 Helloween covered the song for their 1999 cover album Metal Jukebox.

 Amy Winehouse covered the song in a live performance on BBC3 in 2004.

 Jim Sturgess covered the song for the 2007 film Across the Universe. His version was the opening song on the film's soundtrack.

 Prince Buster's All Stars covered the song on the B-Side of "Try a Little Tenderness" in 1968.

 Herb Alpert and the Tijuana Brass covered the song for their 1964 album South of the Border.

Notes

References

External links 

 
 Guitar chords

1960s ballads
Pop ballads
The Beatles songs
Song recordings produced by George Martin
1963 songs
Herb Alpert songs
Chet Atkins songs
Songs written by Lennon–McCartney
Songs published by Northern Songs
Parlophone singles
Capitol Records singles
Number-one singles in Australia
Number-one singles in Canada
Rock ballads